The Medal for Merit in War was a military decoration of the Duchy of Saxe-Meiningen, established during World War I on 7 March 1915 by Bernhard III, Duke of Saxe-Meiningen. For officers, there was the Cross for Merit in War, while the Medal was for enlisted personnel.

Criteria 
The medal was awarded to enlisted personnel and some officers for acts of military merit (both combatants and non-combatants), to all members of the Imperial German Army, but especially to those serving in the regiments affiliated with Saxe-Meiningen. Those included the 32nd and 95th Infantry Regiments.

Description 
On the front side, the medal had an oak leaf wreath on the edge, bound in each quarter by two crossed ribbons. At the center was a curved cross with a round center sign with the letter "B" in the center. Between the cross arms there were three leaves sticking out of the center. On the back side, there was a shield in the center, with Saxe coat of arms is stylized with cross strips and an oblique diamond ridge. Between the cross-arms, there were three leaves sticking out. Between the middle and the border was the circulatory script: FUR VERDIENST IM KREIGE 1914/15.

The medal manufacturer was AWES coin (A. Werner & Söhne) in Berlin. Lauer from Nuremberg took over production of the war metal.

Sources

References

Literature 
Lundström, Richard, and Krause, Daniel. Awards of military orders and honorary marks of the Ernestine Duchies of Saxe-Altenburg, Saxe-Coburg and Gotha and Saxe-Meiningen in the First World War, 1914-1918 (Verleihungen von militärischen Orden und Ehrenzeichen der Ernestinischen Herzogtümer Sachsen-Altenburg, Sachsen-Coburg und Gotha und Sachsen-Meiningen im Ersten Weltkrieg, 1914-1918). 2008.

Orders, decorations, and medals of the Ernestine duchies
Awards established in 1915
Awards disestablished in 1920